"Sally MacLennane" was the second single by The Pogues to make the UK Top 100, reaching number 54. The song was composed by Shane MacGowan and featured on the band's second album, Rum Sodomy & the Lash. It is one of the best known Pogues songs and has been included in all set lists by the reformed Pogues. The song is based on a bar his uncle owned which served Irish  Ford workers in Dagenham.

Sally MacLennane is also a type of stout.

References

External links
 Recipe for Sally Mac stout, The Parting Glass: An Annotated Pogues Lyrics Page

1985 singles
The Pogues songs
Songs written by Shane MacGowan
1985 songs
Songs about alcohol
Song recordings produced by Elvis Costello